Zoltán Horváth is the name of:
  (born 1966), Swiss animation film director
 Zoltán Horváth (basketball) (1979–2009), Hungarian basketball player
 Zoltán Horváth (equestrian) (born 1954), Hungarian equestrian
 Zoltán Horváth (fencer) (born 1937), Hungarian fencer
 Zoltán Horváth (footballer, born 1989), Hungarian football player
 Zoltán Horváth (politician) (born 1974), Hungarian politician